Ingolf Wunder (born 8 September 1985 in Klagenfurt) is an Austrian classical pianist. In 2010, Wunder was the second prize winner at the XVI International Chopin Piano Competition in Warsaw, Poland. He also won special prizes for best concerto, best Polonaise-Fantasie performance, and the public prize at the competition.

Career 
Wunder had his first music lesson at the age of four, initially learning the violin. His talent for the piano was discovered at the age of 14. He studied at the conservatories of Klagenfurt and Linz before joining the University of Music and Performing Arts Vienna. A participant in the earlier 2005 International Chopin Piano Competition, Wunder failed to make the last stage. From 2008 to 2010 he studied under Adam Harasiewicz, who was himself the winner of the Chopin Competition in 1955, in preparation for the 2010 International Chopin Piano Competition.

He has performed around the world, both in solo recital and with orchestras.

In 2019, Wunder had his public conducting debut at the Rubinstein Philharmonic in Lodz, Poland. In 2020, he conducted Górecki's 3rd Symphony at the Opera Leśna.

In 2019, Wunder gave a TEDx talk about the decline in quality of music and how to get out of it. In 2021, he spoke at the United Nations' IGF about the importance of quality music and music education for all of us, in a world full of technology and Artificial intelligence.

Discography 
2006: Works by Frédéric Chopin, Maurice Ravel and Franz Liszt
2011: Works by Frédéric Chopin
2012: INGOLF WUNDER 300
2014: Tchaikovsky & Chopin, with St. Petersburg Philharmonic Orchestra, Vladimir Ashkenazy
2016: Chopin & Liszt in Warsaw

Awards
September 1999; VI Concorso Internazionale di Musica - Premio Vittoria Caffa Righetti (Cortemilia, Italy) – 1st Prize
October 1999: XIV  European Music Competition in (Torino, Italy) – the winner of his age group
November 1999: 63. Steinway Piano Competition (Hamburg, Germany) – 1st Prize
March 2000: Concours Musical de France in (Asti) – 1st Prize
May 2000: Prima la musica 2000 Music Competition (Feldkirch, Austria) – 1st Prize
June 2000: VI Trofeo Internazionale (Casarza Ligure, Italy) – 1st Prize
September 2001: 36. Großer Ferenc Liszt Wettbewerb in (Budapest, Hungary) - Liszt Prize City of Budapest
October 2010: XVI International Chopin Piano Competition in (Warsaw, Poland) – 2nd Prize, Special prizes: "Best Performance of The Polonaise-Fantasy op. 61" and " Best Performance of a Concerto".

References

External links
 Official website
 appassio.com
 appassimo.com

1985 births
Living people
Austrian classical pianists
Male classical pianists
Prize-winners of the International Chopin Piano Competition
Deutsche Grammophon artists
21st-century classical pianists